NGC 1090 is a barred spiral galaxy located in the constellation Cetus.

NGC 1090 has a pseudo inner ring. The disc has a very low surface brightness.

This galaxy has been the site of two known supernovae: SN 1962K and SN 1971T.

NGC 1090 is not part of a galaxy group, even though it appears close to NGC 1087, M-77 (NGC 1068), NGC 1055, NGC 1073, and five other small irregular galaxies.

The distance to NGC 1090 is approximately 124 million light years and its diameter is about 144,000 light years.

References

External links
 
 

Barred spiral galaxies
Cetus (constellation)
1090
02247
10507